Quisqueya (or Kiskeya or Kiskella) is one of the names of Hispaniola Island believed to mean "mother of all lands" in the Taíno language.  The name and its demonym "quisqueyano" may refer to:

Quisqueya, Dominican Republic, a municipality of the San Pedro de Macorís province
Estadio Quisqueya, a baseball stadium in Santo Domingo 
Quisqueyano, person of Dominican descent
Quisqueyano Christian Democratic Party
Quisqueya (plant), a genus of Laeliinae
TQ (Haiti) or Tele Quisqueya, a television station located in Saint-Marc, Haiti
Université Quisqueya, a University in Haiti
Quisqueya, Distrito Nacional, a neighborhood in the city of Santo Domingo